Bharati Vidyapeeth University Medical College & Hospital, Sangli or BVDU Medical College, Sangli  is a Medical college located in Sangli, Maharashtra. This institute is the constituent college of Bharati Vidyapeeth. The institute has 150 undergraduate seats for MBBS course.

References

External links
 

Universities and colleges in Pune
Universities in Maharashtra
Deemed universities in India